Jon Wilton Kilgore (December 3, 1943 – April 14, 2020) was an American football punter who played for five seasons for the Los Angeles Rams, Chicago Bears, and San Francisco 49ers.

He died on April 14, 2020, in Atlanta, Georgia at age 76.

References

External links
 Jon Kilgore Stats

1943 births
2020 deaths
American football punters
Los Angeles Rams players
Chicago Bears players
San Francisco 49ers players
Auburn Tigers football players
People from South Carolina